Plougonvelin is a commune in the Finistère department of Brittany in north-western France.

Geography

Climate
Plougonvelin has a oceanic climate (Köppen climate classification Cfb).

Population
Inhabitants of Plougonvelin are called in French Plougonvelinois.

Breton language

The municipality launched a plan for the Breton language through Ya d'ar brezhoneg on 16 June 2005. In 2008, 8.44% of primary-school children attended bilingual schools.

Sights

Abbaye Saint-Mathieu de Fine-Terre
Fort de Bertheaume

See also
Communes of the Finistère department

References

External links

Official website 

Mayors of Finistère Association 

Communes of Finistère